The Rainbow People is a live album by American saxophonist Dexter Gordon and trumpeter Benny Bailey, recorded in Sweden in 1974 and released on the SteepleChase label in 2002.

Critical reception 

AllMusic critic David R. Adler stated "This previously unreleased live recording, from a 1974 Scandinavian tour, highlights the strong partnership of Dexter Gordon and trumpeter Benny Bailey. ... Happily, the disc captures Gordon in excellent form. From the very first minutes, his tonal command and forceful yet laid-back swing transport the listener. Bailey's playing is extroverted, full of brash wit."

Track listing 
All compositions by Dexter Gordon except where noted.

 "The Rainbow People" – 16:35
 "I Can't Get Started" (Vernon Duke, Ira Gershwin) – 11:57
 "C Jam Blues" (Duke Ellington, Barney Bigard) – 15:09
 "Montmartre" – 20:49

Personnel 
Dexter Gordon – tenor saxophone
Benny Bailey – trumpet
Lars Sjösten – piano
Torbjörn Hultcrantz – bass
Jual Curtis – drums

References 

SteepleChase Records live albums
Benny Bailey live albums
Dexter Gordon live albums
2002 live albums